Bonto Marannu is a village in Uluere district, Bantaeng Regency in South Sulawesi province. Its population is 1443.

Climate
Bonto Marannu has a tropical monsoon climate (Am) with little rainfall in August and September and heavy to very heavy rainfall in the remaining months with extremely heavy rainfall in January.

References

Villages in South Sulawesi